Sean McKenna (born 8 March 1994 in Dublin) is an Irish cyclist riding for Dan Morrissey–MIG.ie–Pactimo. He was selected to ride for Team Holdsworth Pro Cycling at the 2018 Tour de Yorkshire.

Major results
2017
 5th Road race, National Road Championships
2018
 1st Stage 6 Rás Tailteann

References

1994 births
Living people
Irish male cyclists